Bishop Emeritus Matthew Shija (17 April 1924 – 9 December 2015) was a Tanzanian prelate of the Catholic Church. Shija was born in Puge, Tanzania and was ordained a priest on 17 January 1954. Shija was appointed bishop of the Diocese of Kahama on 11 November 1983 and was ordained bishop on 26 February 1984. Shija served until his retirement on 24 April 2001, having reached the Age limit as described by the Code of Canon Law.

References

20th-century Roman Catholic bishops in Tanzania
21st-century Roman Catholic bishops in Tanzania
Place of death missing
1924 births
2015 deaths
Roman Catholic bishops of Kahama